Apyre separata is a moth of the family Erebidae. It was described by Francis Walker in 1854. It is found in Brazil, French Guiana, Suriname and Guyana.

References

Moths described in 1854
Phaegopterina
Moths of South America